Sahaphap Wongratch also known as Mix (Thai: มิกซ์) or Mixxiw (Thai: มิกซ์ซิว), born on 22 July 1998, is a Thai actor, model, singer and  a former member of the boy band Cute Chef Thailand. He is known for his main role as Tian in GMMTV's A Tale of Thousand Stars (2021) and for playing Muang Nan in Fish Upon the Sky (2021).

Early life and education 
Sahaphap Wongratch was born on 22 July 1998 in Lampang Province, Thailand. He graduated and obtained a high school certificate from Bunyawat Witthayalai School. He can speak Northern dialect or Kam Muang, (Thai: กำเมือง) but in the series 'A Tale of Thousand Stars', he acted in the lead role as a boy from central Thailand, so he had to speak with the standard Thai accent. With his fame and reputation as someone originally from the northern area who can speak the northern dialect fluently, he is frequently asked by the media to speak his dialect during shows or interviews.

Mix is currently a fifth-year student at Chulalongkorn University in the Faculty of Veterinary Science. He entered into the Thailand entertainment industry when he was selected to be part of 
Chula Cute Boy and participated in the parade of the Chula-Thammasat Traditional Football Match, leading out the university flag during the parade.

Career

Official debut and solo activities 
He debuted in 2013, later appearing publicly in shows in 2018 as a guest. He debuted in 2019 as an actor under GMMTV. He was a member of the boy band called "Cute Chef Thailand," and its debut album was Haguttokyuukyuu (มะงึก ๆ อุ๋ง ๆ) In December 2012, he introduced a merchandise line called XIW. He also featured in a Star Wars x Pandora collaboration piece. Additionally, he became an endorser of some international brands (Lazada, Food Panda and Burger King). In his guesting with GMMTV's online show, Arm Share in an episode about "Skin Care Sharing", aside from sharing the Skin care routine and products he uses, he also shared his other nickname which is @mixxiw, which adds to his name MIX, that name rotated to 180°, to became XIW, or "Mixxiw," which serves as his name for his merchandise line.

His name became more popular in Thailand and across the world when he played the lead dramatic role in hit-Thai Boys' Love series A Tale of Thousand Stars as Tian, a rich man turned volunteer teacher in Pha Pun Dao, alongside Pirapat Watthanasetsiri (Earth) who played the role of Chief Phupha. He received positive reviews for his portrayal of Tian, which led to increased popularity and opened more opportunities for him. And because of his and Pirapat's perfect chemistry as a couple in the series, their fandom called them '"EarthMix," derived from their respective names.

Recently, he played the role of "Muang Nan", the kind-hearted, handsome second year student of the Allied Health Sciences Department in another hit-Thai Boys' Love series Fish upon the Sky alongside Phuwin Tangsakyuen, Naravit Lertratkosum (Pond), Trai Nimtawat (Neo), and Thanawin Teeraphosukarn (Louis). On 26 June 2021, he had his first-ever digital fan meeting called Earth Mix: Love at First Live Fan Meeting along with his on-screen partner, Earth Pirapat. He also featured in Fish upon the Sky Live Fan Meeting: A Sky full of Fish alongside his fellow Fish upon the Sky lead stars.

Filmography

Television

Music Video

Short Film

Discography

Awards and nominations

References

External links
 

1998 births
Living people
Sahaphap Wongratch
Sahaphap Wongratch
Sahaphap Wongratch
Sahaphap Wongratch